St Michael's & Wicksteed Ward, formed from the merger of St Michaels Ward and Wicksteed Ward, is a ward of Kettering Borough Council that was created by boundary changes in 2007.

The ward was last fought at Borough Council level in the 2007 local council elections, in which all three seats were won by the Conservatives.

The current councillors are Cllr. Jenny Henson, Cllr. Maggie Done & Cllr. Scott Edwards.

Councillors
Kettering Borough Council Elections 2007
Jenny Henson (Conservative)
Larry Henson (Conservative)
Scott Edwards (Conservative)

Current Ward Boundaries (2007-)

Kettering Borough Council Elections 2007
Note: due to boundary changes, vote changes listed below are based on notional results.

Notional Result: Kettering Borough Council Elections 2003
Note: This ward was created in boundary changes that took effect in May 2007. The figures below are derived from the 2003 results for the former St Michaels and Wicksteed wards.

See also
Kettering
Kettering Borough Council

Electoral wards in Kettering